Agop Terzan (born Terziyan) (October 31, 1927 – April 4, 2020) was a Turkish-Armenian astronomer.  Born in Constantinople Istanbul, he finished his high school from Getronagan Armenian High School, after he received his Bachelor's Degree in Mathematical and Astronomical Science in 1945 and Master Degree on Astronomy in 1949 from Istanbul University, worked as a teacher of mathematics at Central Lyceum of Istanbul. In 1965 he was awarded a doctorate of mathematical sciences by; in 1980 he was awarded a professorship from Lyon University.

He discovered 710 variable stars during the 1960s and 11 globular clusters, including Terzan 5 and Terzan 7 (both discovered in 1968).  Subsequently, he discovered 4430 new variable stars. Terzan also discovered 158 diffuse nebulae, 124 galaxies, and 1428 high proper motion stars.

He was a member of the French National Astronomy Committee and the International Astronomical Union (IAU).

References 

20th-century French astronomers
Armenian astronomers
Turkish emigrants to France
Turkish people of Armenian descent
Scientists from Istanbul
University of Lyon alumni
1927 births
Istanbul University alumni
2020 deaths